Dobri Veličkovski (1943–2006) was the second Director of the Administration for Security and Counterintelligence in Macedonia.

References

Macedonian politicians
1943 births
2006 deaths